Ulysses is a 1705 tragedy by the British writer Nicholas Rowe. Rowe turned back to writing tragedies following his unsuccessful comedy The Biter of the previous year. The cast included Thomas Betterton as Ulysses, Barton Booth as Telemachus, Elizabeth Barry as Penelope and Anne Bracegirdle as Semanthe. Many of the actors also appeared in Rowe's following work The Royal Convert.

It is set during the reign of Ulysses. Focusing on a succession dispute at the Greek court, the Whig Rowe shows his support for both the proposed Act of Union between England and Scotland and the coming Hanoverian Succession in preference to the Jacobite claimants.

References

Bibliography
 Burling, William J. A Checklist of New Plays and Entertainments on the London Stage, 1700-1737. Fairleigh Dickinson Univ Press, 1992.
 Caines, Michael in The Plays and Poems of Nicholas Rowe, Volume I: The Early Plays. Taylor & Francis, 2016.

1705 plays
Plays by Nicholas Rowe
West End plays
English plays
Tragedy plays